Lion Down is a 1951 Goofy cartoon featuring Goofy and Louie the Mountain Lion. The film's plot centers on Goofy and Louie competing for a comfortable place to rest. The film is Louie's third appearance.

Plot
Goofy is trying to enjoy some peace and quiet on his hammock, but can't find a second tree to link it to. It is revealed that Goofy has a mock backyard on top of a huge skyscraper. To get a new tree, he heads out of the city and into the country to get a tree, one that is the home of Louie the Mountain Lion. Goofy and Louie begin competing for the hammock and tree (for example, they push each other off and sneak in after placing a doorbell call). Eventually, Goofy and Louie's competition for a resting place causes the hammock to break free out of the building, resulting in nothing but mayhem. Goofy and Louie decide to go their own ways, with Goofy staying where he is and Louie heading back to the countryside with his tree. Fortunately, an acorn falls off, and Goofy ties a knot on it, then he starts watering it, planning to grow his own tree for the hammock.

Home media
The short was released on December 2, 2002, on Walt Disney Treasures: The Complete Goofy and on the "Walt Disney's Classic Cartoon Favorites Starring Goofy" Volume 3.

See also
Father's Lion
Hook, Lion and Sinker
Lion Around

References

External links

1950s Disney animated short films
1951 short films
1951 animated films
Films directed by Jack Kinney
Films produced by Walt Disney
Goofy (Disney) short films
Films scored by Paul Smith (film and television composer)
Films about cougars
1950s English-language films
American animated short films
RKO Pictures short films
RKO Pictures animated short films
Animated films about dogs